Opalotype or opaltype is an early technique of photography.

Opalotypes were printed on sheets of opaque, translucent white glass; early opalotypes were sometimes hand-tinted with colors to enhance their effect. The effect of opalotype has been compared "to watercolor or even pastel in its softer coloring and tender mood." "Opalotype portraits...for beauty and delicacy of detail, are equal to ivory miniatures."

The basic opalotype technique, involving wet collodion and silver gelatin, was patented in 1857 by Glover and Bold of Liverpool. Opalotypes exploited two basic techniques, using either the transfer of a carbon print onto glass, or the exposure of light-sensitive emulsion on the glass surface to the negative. Opalotype photography, never common, was practiced in various forms until it waned and disappeared in the 1930s. "Milk glass positive" is another alternative term for an opalotype.

Opalotype is one of a number of early photographic techniques now generally consigned to historical status, including ambrotype, autochrome, cyanotype, daguerrotype, ivorytype, kallitype, orotone, and tintype. This and many other historical photographic methods are now considered alternative photographic techniques and are practised by a small number of dedicated artists.

Notes

References
 Mentzer, Jennifer Jae. "The Technical Study of Two Opaltypes." Photographic Records Working Group Newsletter, April 2004; pp. 3–4.
 Perez, Michael, editor-in-chief. Focal Encyclopedia of Photography. Oxford, Focal Press, 2007.
 Wall, Edward John. The Dictionary of Photography for the Amateur and Professional Photographer. London, Hazelton, Watson & Viney, 1902.

External links
 An example of opalotype.
 A second example.
 A third example.
 A fourth example.
 Alternative Photographic Processes web site

Photographic techniques